Table setting (laying a table) or place setting refers to the way to set a table with tableware—such as eating utensils and for serving and eating. The arrangement for a single diner is called a place setting. It is also the layout in which the utensils and ornaments are positioned. The practice of dictating the precise arrangement of tableware has varied across cultures and historical periods.

Place setting
Informal settings generally have fewer utensils and dishes but use a layout based on more formal settings. Utensils are arranged in the order and according to the manner in which the diner will use them.  In the West, forks, plate, butter knife, and napkin generally are placed to the left of the dinner plate, and knives, spoons, stemware and tumblers, cups, and saucers to the right.  (By contrast, formal settings in Armenia place the fork to the right of the dinner plate and informal settings in Turkey place the fork to the right of the dinner plate if not accompanied by a knife)  Sauceboats and serving dishes, when used, either are placed on the table or, more formally, may be kept on a side table.

Informal

At an informal setting, fewer utensils are used and serving dishes are placed on the table. Sometimes the cup and saucer are placed on the right side of the spoon, about 30 cm or 12 inches from the edge of the table. Often, in less formal settings, the napkin should be in the wine glass.  However, such objects as napkin rings are very rare in the United Kingdom, Spain, Mexico, or Italy.

Formal

Utensils are placed inward about 20 cm or 8 inches from the edge of the table, with all placed either upon the same invisible baseline or upon the same invisible median line.  Utensils in the outermost position are to be used first (for example, a soup spoon or a salad fork, later the dinner fork and the dinner knife).  The blades of the knives are turned toward the plate.  Glasses are placed an inch (2.5 cm) or so above the knives, also in the order of use:  white wine, red wine, dessert wine, and water tumbler.

Formal dinner

The most formal dinner is served from the kitchen.  When the meal is served, in addition to the central plate (a service plate or dinner plate at supper; at luncheon, a service plate or luncheon plate) at each place there are a bread roll (generally on a bread plate, sometimes in the napkin), napkin, and flatware (knives and spoons to the right of the central plate, and forks to the left).  Coffee is served in Butler Service style in demitasses, and a spoon placed on the saucer to the right of each handle.  Serving dishes and utensils are not placed on the table for a formal dinner.  The only exception in the West to these general rules is the protocol followed at the Spanish royal court, which was also adopted by the Austrian court, in which all cutlery was placed to the right of the central plate for each diner.

At a less formal dinner, not served from the kitchen, the dessert fork and spoon can be set above the plate, fork pointing right, spoon pointing left.

Formal dining

See also
 Cutlery (US: Flatware)
 Haft-Sin, traditional table setting of Nowruz, the traditional Iranian spring celebration.
 List of glassware
 Napkin folding
 Silver service,  a method of table service in the United Kingdom
 Tableware

References

Further reading 

 

Serving and dining
Etiquette